Clusia tarmensis is a species of flowering plant in the family Clusiaceae. It is found only in Peru.

References

tarmensis
Vulnerable plants
Endemic flora of Peru
Trees of Peru
Taxonomy articles created by Polbot